Ogechika Brian Heil (born 27 November 2000) is a German professional footballer who plays as a midfielder for Hamburger SV.

Career
Heil played for the youth teams of Fortuna Kassel, KSV Baunatal and Hessen Kassel, before joining the academy of Hamburger SV in 2016. In 2019, he was promoted to Hamburg's second team. He made his professional debut for Hamburg's first team on 3 January 2021, coming on as a substitute in the 90th minute for Bakery Jatta against Jahn Regensburg. The home match finished as a 3–1 win for Hamburger SV.

Personal life
Heil is a native of Kassel, Hesse, and was born to a German father and a Nigerian mother.

References

External links
 
 
 

2000 births
Living people
Sportspeople from Kassel
Footballers from Hesse
German footballers
German sportspeople of Nigerian descent
Association football midfielders
Hamburger SV II players
Hamburger SV players
Go Ahead Eagles players
2. Bundesliga players
Regionalliga players
Eredivisie players
German expatriate footballers
Expatriate footballers in the Netherlands
German expatriate sportspeople in the Netherlands